Ghulam Mustafa Khan was a Pakistani cricket administrator and statistician who was Wisden's Pakistan correspondent from 1959 to 1983. He was also a contributor in The Cricketer magazine.

Born on 17 January 1932 in Multan, Pakistan, he was a graduate of the University of Karachi.

References

1932 births
2016 deaths
Pakistani statisticians
Pakistani cricket administrators
People from Multan